El Idrissia District is a district of Djelfa Province, Algeria.

Municipalities
The district is further divided into 3 municipalities:

El Idrissia
Douis
Aïn Chouhada

Districts of Djelfa Province